Cerro al Volturno is a comune (municipality) in the Province of Isernia, in the Italian region of Molise.

The town was founded in the 3rd century BC by the Samnites. It houses a castle called Pandone, built around 1000 on a spur commanding the nearby valley.

References

Cities and towns in Molise